The 13th Pan American Games were held in Winnipeg, Manitoba, Canada from July 23 to August 8, 1999.

Medals

Silver

Women's 400m Hurdles: Andrea Blackett

Bronze

Women's 4x400 metres: Joanne Durant, Melissa Straker, Andrea Blackett, and Tanya Oxley

Results by event

See also
 Sport in Barbados
 Barbados at the 2000 Summer Olympics

References
Barbados Olympic Committee

Nations at the 1999 Pan American Games
P
1999